The Europlug is a flat, two-pole, round-pin domestic AC power plug, rated for voltages up to 250 V and currents up to 2.5 A. It is a compromise design intended to connect low-power Class II appliances safely to the many different forms of round-pin domestic power socket used across Europe. However, it is not compatible with the rectangular-pin BS 1363 sockets found in Cyprus, Gibraltar, Hong Kong, Ireland, Malta and the United Kingdom. Europlugs are non-rewirable and must be supplied attached to a power cord.

History  
The Europlug design, intended for use with socket-outlets meeting other standards, appeared first in 1963 as Alternative II of Standard Sheet XVI in the second edition of CEE Publication 7 by the contributing members of Austria, Belgium, Czechoslovakia, Denmark, Federal Republic of Germany, Finland, France, Greece, Hungary, Italy, Netherlands, Norway, Poland, Portugal, Sweden, Switzerland, United Kingdom, and Yugoslavia. The Europlug is therefore sometimes also referred to as the "CEE 7/16 Alternative II plug" or simply as the "CEE 7/16 plug". It was also described in 1975 as plug C5 in IEC Technical Report 83. In 1990 it was defined by Cenelec standard EN 50075 which has national equivalents in most European countries, as described in IEC 60083 which superseded IEC/TR 83 (and no longer uses the C5 designation).

The Europlug is unusual as the standard specifies only a plug; there is no socket-outlet designed specifically for use with it.

Design considerations

The dimensions of the Europlug were chosen for compatibility and safe use, such that with continental European domestic power sockets

 reliable contact is established when the plug is fully inserted;
 no live conductive parts are accessible while the plug is inserted into each type of socket;
 it is not possible to establish a connection between one pin and a live socket contact while the other pin is accessible.

Additionally, the design allows for a more compact and less bulky design of mobile phone chargers, than the BS 1363 form factor in the UK.

Europlugs are only designed for low-power (less than 2.5 A) Class II (double-insulated) devices that operate at normal room temperature and do not require a protective-earth connection.

Details 

The pins of the Europlug are 19 mm long. They consist of a 9 mm long conductive tip of 4 mm diameter with a rounded ending, followed by a 10 mm long flexible insulated shaft of not more than 3.8 mm diameter. The two pins are not exactly parallel and converge slightly; their centres are 17.5 mm apart at the tip and 18.6 mm apart at the base. The elasticity of the converging pins provides sufficient contact force for the Europlug's current rating with a variety of socket-hole arrangements. The entire plug is 35.3 mm wide and 13.7 mm high, and must not exceed these dimensions within 18 mm behind its front plane (this allows for the recesses on many European socket types). The left and right side of the plug are formed by surfaces that are at 45° relative to the horizontal plane.

Compatibility

Types C, E, F, and K 
The Europlug is designed to be compatible with these sockets. They have 4.8 mm holes with centres spaced 19 mm apart. The minimum distance between the holes is thus 14.2 mm, while the minimum distance between the converged pins on the Europlug is 13.5 mm, allowing it to grip the socket despite its smaller pin width.

Type D 
The Europlug is not compatible with type D sockets, used in e.g. India and South Africa. These sockets have 5.1 mm holes with centres spaced 19.1 mm apart, which means a Europlug can be inserted if the sockets do not have protective shutters. However, the socket design might not allow the plug to grip it.

Type G 
The Europlug is physically not compatible with BS 1363 13 A sockets, used in e.g. the UK and Ireland.  UK law requires a suitable fuse to be fitted in each plug to protect the appliance flexible cord; Europlugs do not contain such fuses. BS 1363 sockets contain a child-safety shutter; clause 13.7.2 of BS 1363-2 requires that Europlugs will not open the shutters. In some types of BS 1363 socket (but not all) the safety mechanism can be tampered with so that a Europlug may then be forced into the open  and neutral ports. The UK Electrical Safety Council has drawn attention to the fire risk associated with forcing Europlugs into BS 1363 sockets. There is also a risk of damage to both the plug and socket.

UK Consumer Protection legislation requires that most domestic electrical goods sold must be provided with fitted plugs to BS 1363-1. The exception is that shavers, electric toothbrushes and similar personal hygiene products may be supplied with a Europlug as an alternative to the BS 4573 plug (see below).

Fused conversion plugs to BS 1363-5 are available for Europlugs, and equipment fitted with these may be legally sold in the UK.

BS 4573 (UK shaver) 
The Europlug is not designed to be compatible with BS 4573 sockets. These sockets have 5.1 mm holes with centres spaced 16.7 mm apart, meaning a reliable contact might not be possible.

Most 2-pin UK shaver sockets will accept either BS 4573 plugs or Europlugs, but are rated for a maximum of 0.2 A. UK Consumer Protection legislation allows for shavers, electric toothbrushes and similar personal hygiene products to be supplied with a Europlug as an alternative to the BS 4573 plug.

Type H 
Originally these sockets had flat openings and were not compatible with the Europlug. In 1989 a new version was designed to be compatible with the Europlug. Newer sockets have 4.5 mm holes with centres spaced 19 mm apart. The minimum distance between the holes is thus 14.5 mm, while the minimum distance between the converged pins on the Europlug is 13.5 mm, allowing it to grip the socket despite its smaller pin width.

SN 441011 (Switzerland), Type J 
The Europlug is designed to be compatible with Type 11 & 12 (outdated single-phase sockets, 10 A) and Type 13 (recessed single-phase socket, 10 A; Type J) and is consequently compatible with all by SN 441011 currently supported sockets. This includes Type 15 (three-phase, 10 A), Type 21 & 23 (single-phase, 16 A) and Type 25 (three-phase, 16 A). The diameter of the openings of the 10 A sockets is 4.5 mm and the openings of the 16 A sockets are 4.5 x 5.5 mm wide. The norm space between L (one-phase) or L1 (three-phase) and N is 19 mm.

Type L 
The Europlug is designed to be compatible with 10A Type L sockets, commonly found in Italy. They have 4.0 mm holes with centres spaced 19 mm apart.  It is also compatible with dual 10A/16A sockets, but it does not fit into the 16A only variant.

Type N 
The 10 A variant of type N used in Brazil has 4.0 mm holes and also allows the Europlug to be used; see Types J and L. The 20 A variant has 4.8 mm holes and also allows the Europlug to be used; see Types E, F and K.

See also 
 AC power plugs and sockets
 IEC 60906-1 – the international standard for 230 V plugs and sockets
 Schuko – the system of CEE 7/3 sockets and CEE 7/4 plugs
 CEE 7 standard AC plugs and sockets#CEE 7/7 plug (compatible with E and F), a hybrid between the Schuko (Type F) and French (Type E) plug, the earthed version power plug used throughout most of Europe

References

External links 

 German Standard DIN VDE 0620-1: Plugs and socket-outlets for household and similar purposes - Part 1: General requirements.

EN standards
Mains power connectors